Miguel Ángel López Castro (born 25 March 1997) is a Cuban volleyball player. He is part of the Cuban national team, a participant at the Olympic Games Rio 2016. At the professional club level, he plays for Sada Cruzeiro.

Early life
Lopez Castro was born in Cienfuegos Province, Cuba, as the youngest of 3 children of Elcida Juana Castro and Miguel Angel Lopez Martinez.
His interest in volleyball began at the age of seven, when he saw footage of former Cuban star Joel Despaigne and his jumping ability.

By the age of 18, he was selected among other young players to the national volleyball centre "Escuela National de Voleibol" in Havana, as one of the top promises in the country.

Sporting achievements

Clubs
 FIVB Club World Championship
  Betim 2021 – with Sada Cruzeiro
  Betim 2022 – with Sada Cruzeiro

 CSV South American Club Championship  Contagem 2020 – with UPCN Vóley Club
  Contagem 2022 – with Sada Cruzeiro

 National championships 2019/2020  Argentine Cup, with UPCN Vóley Club
 2020/2021  Brazilian Cup, with Sada Cruzeiro
 2021/2022  Brazilian SuperCup, with Sada Cruzeiro
 2021/2022  Brazilian Championship, with Sada Cruzeiro

Youth national team
 2016  U23 Pan American Cup
 2017  U21 Pan American Cup
 2017  FIVB U21 World Championship
 2017  FIVB U23 World Championship
 2018  U23 Pan American Cup

Individual awards
 2016: U23 Pan American Cup – Best Outside Hitter
 2016: U23 Pan American Cup – Best Server
 2017: U21 Pan American Cup – Best Outside Hitter
 2017: Pan American Cup – Best Outside Hitter
 2018: Pan American Cup – Best Outside Hitter
 2018: U23 Pan American Cup – Best Outside Hitter
 2019: Pan American Cup – Most Valuable Player
 2019: NORCECA Championship – Most Valuable Player
 2020: CSV South American Club Championship – Best Outside Hitter
 2021: FIVB Club World Championship – Best Outside Hitter
 2021: FIVB Club World Championship – Most Valuable Player
 2022: CSV South American Club Championship – Most Valuable Player
 2022: Brazilian Championship – Best Outside Hitter
 2022:' Brazilian Championship – Most Valuable Player

References

External links
 Player profile at Volleybox.net'' 

1997 births
Living people
People from Cienfuegos
Cuban men's volleyball players
Olympic volleyball players of Cuba
Volleyball players at the 2016 Summer Olympics
Pan American Games medalists in volleyball
Pan American Games silver medalists for Cuba
Volleyball players at the 2019 Pan American Games
Medalists at the 2019 Pan American Games
Cuban expatriate sportspeople in Argentina
Expatriate volleyball players in Argentina
Cuban expatriate sportspeople in Brazil
Expatriate volleyball players in Brazil
Outside hitters
21st-century Cuban people